St. Martin's Press is a book publisher headquartered in Manhattan, New York City, in the Equitable Building. St. Martin's Press is considered one of the largest English-language publishers, bringing to the public some 700 titles a year under six imprints.

The imprints include St. Martin's Press (mainstream and bestseller books), St. Martin's Griffin (mainstream paperback books, including fiction and nonfiction), Minotaur (mystery, suspense, and thrillers), Castle Point Books (specialty nonfiction), St. Martin’s Essentials (lifestyle), and Wednesday Books (young adult fiction).

St. Martin's Press's current editor in chief is George Witte. Jennifer Enderlin was named publisher in 2016.

History 
Macmillan Publishers of the UK founded St. Martin's in 1952 and named it after St Martin's Lane in London, where Macmillan Publishers was headquartered. St. Martin's acquired Tor-Forge Books (science fiction, fantasy, and thrillers). In 1995, Macmillan was sold to Holtzbrinck Publishers, LLC, a group of publishing companies held by Verlagsgruppe Georg von Holtzbrinck, a family owned publishing concern based in Stuttgart, Germany, which also owns publishing houses including Farrar, Straus and Giroux (of mostly literary fiction), Holt Publishers (literary non-fiction).

Authors published by St. Martin's include Mary Kay Andrews, Casey McQuiston, Bill O'Reilly, C. J. Box, Linda Castillo, Ann Cleeves, Kristin Hannah, Lynda Lopez, Ben Coes, Louise Penny, Nora Roberts, Rainbow Rowell, Ian K. Smith, Sally Hepworth, N. Leigh Dunlap, and Jocko Willink. It also publishes the New York Times crossword puzzle books.

Its textbook division, Bedford-St. Martin's, was founded in 1981. In 1984, St. Martin's became the first major trade-book publisher to release its hardcover books by its in-house mass-market paperback company, St. Martin's Mass Market Paperback Co., Inc.

Imprints
St. Martin's Press (mainstream and bestseller books)
St. Martin's Griffin (mainstream trade paperback books, including romance)
Minotaur (Mystery, suspense, and thrillers); winners of the St. Martin's Press "Malice Domestic" First Traditional Mystery Contest receive a $10,000 one-book Minotaur publishing contract
Castle Point Books (specialty nonfiction) 
St. Martin’s Essentials (Lifestyle) 
Wednesday Books (young adult fiction)

References

External links
 

 
Book publishing companies based in New York (state)
Publishing companies based in New York City
Publishing companies established in 1952
1952 establishments in New York City
American companies established in 1952
Holtzbrinck Publishing Group